Eisele is a German surname. Notable people with the surname include:

Alois Eisele (1914–2008), German Wehrmacht officer
Carolyn Eisele (1902–2000), American mathematician
Donn F. Eisele (1930–1987), American astronaut
Garnett Thomas Eisele (1923–2017), American judge
George Raymond Eisele (1923–1942), United States Naval Reserve sailor
Hans Eisele (disambiguation), multiple people
John Eisele (1884–1933), American middle-distance runner

See also
USS Eisele

German-language surnames